

This is a list of the National Register of Historic Places listings in New Haven County, Connecticut. It is intended to be a complete list of the properties and districts on the National Register of Historic Places in New Haven County, Connecticut, United States. The locations of National Register properties and districts for which the latitude and longitude coordinates are included below, may be seen in an online map.

There are 273 properties and districts listed on the National Register in the county, including 10 National Historic Landmarks. The city of New Haven is the location of 69 of these properties and districts, including 9 National Historic Landmarks; they are listed separately, while the 207 properties and districts in the remaining parts of the county, including one National Historic Landmark (Henry Whitfield House), are listed here. Three sites appear in both lists.

Current listings

New Haven

Exclusive of New Haven

|}

See also

List of National Historic Landmarks in Connecticut
National Register of Historic Places listings in Connecticut

References

 
 
New Haven